A Collection of Songs Written and Recorded 1995–1997 is the debut studio album by Bright Eyes. The album is the first commercial release by Conor Oberst and features his vocals and guitar. This album is the 19th release of Saddle Creek Records. The album was reissued alongside a six-track companion EP by Dead Oceans on May 27, 2022.

Track listing

Personnel 
 Conor Oberst – writing, singing, strumming, keyboards, low rhythm, drumming, sounds
 Ted Stevens – drumming on "The Awful Sweetness of Escaping Sweat"
 Todd Fink – sounds and drumming on "I Watched You Taking Off"
 Matt Bowen – left-handed drumming on "One Straw (Please)"
 Neely Jenkins – backup singing on "Feb. 15th"
 Matthew Oberst, Sr. – lead strumming on "The 'Feel Good' Revolution"

Charts

References

1998 debut albums
Bright Eyes (band) albums
Saddle Creek Records albums